The Bletchley Circle is a television mystery drama series, set in 1952–53, about four women who worked as codebreakers at Bletchley Park. Dissatisfied with the officials' failure to investigate complex crimes, the women join to investigate for themselves.

The first series of the miniseries, produced for ITV, was originally shown in the UK in 2012 and premiered in the U.S. in April 2013, on PBS.  A second series was broadcast on ITV in January 2014 and on PBS in April 2014. Both series were later aired by Australia's ABC TV.  The series was distributed worldwide by Kew Media.

The programme was not renewed for a third series. However, in 2018, a spinoff series titled The Bletchley Circle: San Francisco was announced by ITV and BritBox.

Plot 
Susan Gray, Millie, Lucy, and Jean worked together at Bletchley Park to decipher German military codes for the British military, during World War II. After a brief introduction of the four women at Bletchley during the war, the series begins in 1952, seven years after the war's end, when Susan, Millie, Lucy, and Jean have returned to their ordinary lives. As the story begins, Susan learns about a series of murders that have occurred in the London area and begins to recognise patterns connecting the killings. This inspires her to return to her codebreaking past, and she reaches out first to Millie, and then to Lucy and Jean, after unsuccessfully trying to convince the police to follow up her theory about the crimes.

As they all signed orders of secrecy about their work during the war, the two married women (Susan and Lucy), disguise their activities from their husbands as a book club. Failing to secure police involvement, they move from codebreaking and investigation into the realm of field work, with dangerous consequences on several occasions. Scenes of domestic tranquility are contrasted with scenes of the killer stalking and torturing his victims. While initially skeptical about becoming involved, Millie, Jean, and Lucy are convinced to help Susan once they realise the lives of many women are on the line.

The series contrasts the conventional but very different lives of the four women and the sense of usefulness they felt while codebreaking during the war.  In the Series 1 finale, the women are forced to confront the man they suspect to be the killer.

Cast and characters 
 Anna Maxwell Martin as Susan Gray, a housewife and the mother of two children. She is troubled by the mundanity of her current life.
 Rachael Stirling as Camilla 'Millie' Harcourt, an independent-minded single woman. She and Susan lost touch when Susan decided to pursue a more conventional lifestyle. Her room becomes the meeting point for the group.
 Sophie Rundle as Lucy, the youngest member of the circle. She is married to an indolent man named Harry, who beats her when she returns from an investigation. Lucy has an eidetic memory and specialises in recalling and processing data.
 Julie Graham as Jean McBrian, the oldest woman in the circle, was a supervisor of the younger women at Bletchley. A librarian after the war, she has many connections and access to information.
 Mark Dexter as Timothy Gray, war veteran and the husband of Susan Gray. He is unaware of Susan's service as a codebreaker during the war.
 Ed Birch as Harry, Lucy's controlling husband, who beat her when he suspected her of infidelity after she was attacked. 
 Michael Gould as Deputy Commissioner Wainwright. Also a war veteran, Commissioner Wainwright served with Timothy Gray during the war and now heads the local Metropolitan Police division. 
 Simon Sherlock as DCI Compton
 Simon Williams as Cavendish. Cavendish was a high-ranking member of the Special Operations Executive who helps Susan by providing information from Malcolm Crowley's personnel file.
 Steven Robertson as Malcolm Crowley, a disturbed veteran who worked with Cavendish on psychological warfare techniques during the war. 
 Hattie Morahan as Alice Merren (series 2), a former Bletchley Park colleague, awaiting trial for killing John Richards, her old flame and a Bletchley scientist. Jean, believing Alice is covering for someone, begins to reunite the circle to help establish her innocence.
 Faye Marsay as Lizzie Lancaster (series 2)
 Nick Blood as Ben Gladstone (series 2), Lucy's colleague and love interest

Episode list

Series 1 (2012)

Series 2 (2014)
This series is made up of two 2-part stories totalling four episodes.

Allusions to real events

The premise of the series is based on the women who worked at Bletchley Park during World War II, who for the most part did not continue in intelligence work, and under the rules of the Official Secrets Act 1939 in the UK never shared the nature of their contributions to crucial aspects of the Allies' victory.

In the second series, one character refers to sarin gas as having been developed by the Germans during World War II, along with other such chemical weapons, then taken up by the former Allies. The UK did have an incident of a young man killed from experiments with the gas in 1953; in 2004, his inquest was reopened, and the cause of death was altered from death by misadventure to death by "application of a nerve agent in a non-therapeutic experiment".

Reception
Upon its U.S. premiere—which occurred in prime time following U.S. episodes of Call the Midwife and Mr Selfridge—Variety called The Bletchley Circle "smart, addictive and situated in a fascinating historical moment". In a review of the first series, The New York Times said the series finds "a clever, entertaining way to pay tribute to women who in their time were often overlooked and underestimated, and nevertheless found ways to never be ordinary".

References

Further reading
  Discussion of the show's historical accuracy

External links
 
 The Bletchley Circle at PBS

2010s British drama television series
2012 British television series debuts
2014 British television series endings
Bletchley Park
British crime television series
English-language television shows
ITV television dramas
Television series by ITV Studios
Television series by World Productions
PBS original programming
Television shows set in the United Kingdom
Cryptography in fiction